Argentozethus is a neotropical genus of potter wasps restricted to north-western Argentina, containing a single species, Argentozethus willinki.

References

 Stange, L. A. 1979. Tipos de distribución de la subfamilia Discoeliinae con las descripciones de dos géneros nuevos de Argentina (Hymenoptera: Eumenidae). Acta zool. lilloana, 35 (2): 729–741.

Potter wasps
Monotypic Hymenoptera genera